Sanulrim (Hangul: 산울림), also spelled Sanullim, was a South Korean rock band that debuted in 1977. They are considered to be one of South Korea's most influential rock groups. The band consisted of brothers Kim Chang-wan, Kim Chang-hoon, and Kim Chang-ik.

History
The three members of Sanulrim are brothers, not unlike the bands Gentle Giant and the Bee Gees. They were Kim Chang-wan (김창완, 1954-), Kim Chang-hoon (김창훈, 1956-), Kim Chang-ik (김창익, 1958-2008).

The band, formed when the three were university students, was initially called 무이 (Mui) and was never meant to be professional. Kim Chang-hoon's other college band, named "Sand Pebbles," won the MBC College K-pop Festival with their song, "나 어떡해 (What Shall I Do)". Mui was initially nominated to win with their song, "문좀 열어줘 (Please Open the Door)" but was not qualified because Kim Chang-wan had already graduated from the university.

Gaining confidence, the band looked for a music agency and changed the name of the band into 'Sanulrim' by their new manager's demand.

The band released their first album in December 1977. The album largely impacted the Korean music scene and became both critically and commercially successful. The album, entitled vol.1 아니벌써 (vol.1 What, Already?) brought new type of music which Koreans had never heard before. People were absorbed with the psychedelic/hard rock sound the band produced. Sanulrim's appearance in the music scene was also dramatic and significant because they vitalized the Korean music scene, which was currently devastated after several major musicians were arrested for marijuana possession around the middle of 1970's.

During 1977-1984, they released 10 or more albums and helped other musicians. With the K-pop retrospective boom during the 1990s, all of their albums were reissued and a tribute album was released. Sanulrim performed in Seoul on July 5, 2007 and July 6, 2007 for their 30th anniversary and planned to release a vol. 14 album within the same year.

On January 29, 2008, drummer Kim Chang-ik was killed in a traffic accident while driving a forklift during heavy snow in Vancouver, British Columbia, Canada. Kim Chang-wan announced the end of the band after his brother's death.

After the breakup, Kim Chang-wan has been actively performing as a musician, actor, writer and broadcast celebrity. He was one of the antagonists in the hit South Korean medical drama White Tower, and had a supporting role in the romantic comedy Coffee Prince. Kim Chang-hoon resides in Los Angeles with his family.

Discography

Studio albums

Awards

Korean Music Awards

See also
Kim Chang-wan

References

Accidental deaths in British Columbia
Road incident deaths in Canada
South Korean folk rock groups
Musical groups established in 1977
Sibling musical trios
South Korean musical trios